District Harburg is a district (Landkreis) in Hamburg and Lower Saxony, Germany. It takes its name from the town of Harburg upon Elbe, which used to be the capital of the district but is now part of Hamburg. It is bounded by (from the east and clockwise) the districts of Lüneburg, Heidekreis, Rotenburg (Wümme) and Stade, by the City of Hamburg and the State of Schleswig-Holstein (District of Lauenburg).

History
In 1885 the Prussian government established three districts in this region: the District of Harburg, the District of Winsen and the district-free City of Harburg upon Elbe. In 1932 the districts of Winsen and Harburg were merged; the City of Harburg-Wilhelmsburg (which had been merged in 1927) became the capital of the district, although it remained district-free and hence was not a part of the district.

In 1937 the City of Harburg-Wilhelmsburg was incorporated into the City of Hamburg with the Greater Hamburg Act. Harburg and Wilhelmsburg became two boroughs of Hamburg. The District of Harburg remained with the State of Prussia and retained its autonomy. Winsen upon Luhe became the new capital of the District in 1944.

Geography
The District is located south of Hamburg and includes several suburbs of the Hamburg metropolitan area. In the south of the district part of the Lüneburg Heath (Lüneburger Heide) is found.

Coat of arms
The lion was the heraldic animal of the Welfen family and the Duchy of Brunswick-Lüneburg, to which the region belonged before it became part of Prussia. The key is from the arms of the Prince-Archbishopric of Bremen, to which western parts of the district belonged earlier.

Cities and municipalities

References

External links

Official site 

 
Districts of Lower Saxony